The 2016–17 FA Vase is the 43rd season of the FA Vase, an annual football competition for teams playing below Step 4 of the English National League System. The competition is to be played with two qualifying rounds preceding the six proper rounds, semi-finals (played over two legs) and final to be played at Wembley Stadium.  All first-leg ties until the semi-finals are played with extra time if drawn after regulation – first-leg ties may also be resolved with penalties if both teams agree and notify the referee at least 45 minutes before kick-off (rule 11a).

Calendar
The calendar for the 2016–17 FA Vase, as announced by The Football Association.

First round qualifying

Second round qualifying

First round proper

Second round proper

Third round proper

Match abandoned in 87th minute (0–1) due to spectator medical emergency, Basildon United subsequently withdrew from competition.

Fourth round proper

 – Match abandoned after floodlight failure in the 81st minute (2–4) – rematch moved to Morpeth Town

Fifth round proper

Sixth round proper

Semi-finals
Semi final fixtures are due to be played on 11 March and 18 March 2016, with the second leg going to extra time and penalties if required.

First leg

Second leg

Final

References

FA Vase seasons
England
Fa Vase